"Totally Hot" is a song recorded by British-Australian singer Olivia Newton-John. It was released as the third and final single from her 1978 tenth studio album of the same name, and reached number 52 on the US Billboard Hot 100 and number 92 on the Canadian RPM Top Singles chart.

"Totally Hot" was released as a double-A sided single in the United States and "Dancin' 'Round and 'Round" was sent to country radio, peaking at number 29 on the Hot Country Songs chart.

Track listing 
All tracks produced by John Farrar.
 "Totally Hot" (Farrar) – 3:14
 "Dancin' 'Round and 'Round" (Adam Mitchell) – 4:00

Charts

References 

1978 songs
1979 singles
Olivia Newton-John songs
Songs written by John Farrar
MCA Records singles